Packs Branch may refer to:

Packs Branch, West Virginia, an unincorporated community
Packs Branch (Paint Creek), a stream in West Virginia